Edward Barrow may refer to:

Ed Barrow (1868–1953), American baseball executive
Edward Dodsley Barrow (1867–1956), Canadian politician